The Sydney Technical College, now known as the TAFE New South Wales Sydney Institute, is a technical school established in 1878, that superseded the Sydney Mechanics' School of Arts. The college is one of Australia's oldest technical education institutions.

Forebears
The Sydney Mechanics' School of Arts was founded in 1833. In 1878, the Sydney Mechanics' School of Arts formed the Working Men's College, which eventually became the Sydney Technical College in 1882.

In 1911, the high school operations of the college became Sydney Technical High School.

In 1949, the New South Wales University of Technology was founded on its main site, as a separate institution. As the University of New South Wales, this is now one of the most prestigious universities in Australia.

In 1969, part of the college became the New South Wales Institute of Technology (NSWIT). This institute was reconstituted as the University of Technology, Sydney (UTS), in 1988.

The college continued to operate, eventually becoming part of the New South Wales Technical and Further Education (TAFE) system. It became known as Ultimo College, due to its location. This then became part of the Sydney Institute of Technology, which was later renamed Sydney Institute. This college is the largest TAFE campus in New South Wales.

Architectural students
Many prominent Australian architects studied architecture at Sydney Technical College before there was a university architecture course available in Sydney, but also attended architecture lectures in the Engineering Faculty at the University of Sydney.

 John Allen
 Sydney Ancher
 Arthur Anderson
 Henry Budden
 Walter Bunning
 Hedley Norman Carr
 J Burcham Clamp
 Bruce Dellit
 Jean Fombertaux
 Carlyle Greenwell
 Eric Heath
 Edward Hewlett Hogben
 Archer Hoskings
 Russell Jack
 Colin Madigan
 William Monks
 Glenn Murcutt
 Sir John Overall
 Lord Livingstone Ramsay
 Lindsay Gordon Scott
 Emil Sodersten
 Florence Mary Taylor
 Thomas Tidswell
 Alfred Warden
 B J Waterhouse
 William Hardy Wilson

Gallery

References

TAFE NSW
History of Sydney
Educational institutions established in 1843
University of Technology Sydney
1843 establishments in Australia
Schools of Arts in New South Wales